Pacific City Lines was a company formed in 1937 as a subsidiary to National City Lines in Oakland, California. Its function was to purchase streetcar systems in the western United States as part of what became known as the Great American streetcar scandal. General Motors made investments in 1938.

In 1947 Pacific City Lines, was indicted with General Motors and others on two counts:
conspiring to acquire control of a number of transit companies, forming a transportation monopoly
conspiring to monopolize sales of buses and supplies to companies owned or controlled by National City Lines, Inc., or Pacific City Lines, Inc.

The company was merged into National City Lines in 1948.

See also
General Motors streetcar conspiracy
National City Lines
Key System

References

Public transportation in California
Bus transportation in California